Bonnetia rubicunda is a species of flowering plant in the Bonnetiaceae family. It is found only in Guyana.

References

Endemic flora of Guyana
Vulnerable plants
rubicunda
Taxonomy articles created by Polbot